Lataisi Mwea (born 26 July 2000) is an I-Kiribati athlete who competes in sprinting events.

From 2019, Mwea has been based at the OAA High Performance Training Centre in Gold Coast when he was sent by his Kiribati Athletics Association for a high jump training scholarship. He broke the national record for high jump when he jumped 2.00 m clear in October 2019. After a change of coach to Andrew Lulham, Lataisi indicated also an interest in undertaking sprint training in addition to his jumps training and linked with Leanne Hines-Smith for track sessions. From March 2020, he was stranded in Australia since the closure of borders of his own country and has to stay one year more in Gold Coast.

In January 2021 Mwea set a new national record as he ran 22.61 for the 200 metres. Earlier in the day he ran a 100 metres race where he recorded 11.30 with a +2.5 headwind. On 12 June 2021, in Gold Coast, he run in 11.03, the best ever run by an I-Kiribati but with the same too favorable wind. At the 2020 Summer Games 100m race Mwea ran his heat in 11.25 seconds.

References

External links
 

2000 births
Living people
I-Kiribati male sprinters
Athletes (track and field) at the 2020 Summer Olympics
Olympic athletes of Kiribati
Olympic male sprinters
People from the Gilbert Islands
Athletes (track and field) at the 2022 Commonwealth Games